Silence in the Forest (German: Das Schweigen im Walde) is a 1937 German drama film directed by Hans Deppe and starring Hansi Knoteck, Paul Richter and Gustl Gstettenbaur.

The film's sets were designed by the art director Kurt Dürnhöfer and Hans Kuhnert.

Cast
 Hansi Knoteck as Lo Petri  
 Paul Richter as Heinz von Ettingen  
 Gustl Gstettenbaur as Pepi Praxmaler  
 Käte Merk as Burgl, Sennerin  
 Rolf Pinegger as Brentlinger, Burgls Vater  
 Hans Adalbert Schlettow as Förster Kluibenschädel  
 Hermann Erhardt as Toni Mazegger, Jäger  
 Rudolf Wendl as Kassian Biermoser, Jäger 
 Friedrich Ulmer as Conrad Kersten  
 Friedl Haerlin as Edith von Prankha  
 Carl Ehrhardt-Hardt as Baron Mucki von Feldberg  
 Rudolf Schündler as Martin, Diener  
 Hilde Schneider as Anni, Zofe  
 Fred Goebel as Sekretär  
 Marta Salm as Therese  
 Olga Schaub as Vroni

References

Bibliography 
 Goble, Alan. The Complete Index to Literary Sources in Film. Walter de Gruyter, 1999.

External links 
 

1937 films
Films of Nazi Germany
German drama films
1937 drama films
1930s German-language films
Films directed by Hans Deppe
Films based on works by Ludwig Ganghofer
German black-and-white films
Films set in the Alps
Films set in forests
1930s German films